MOM's Way is the name for a series of highways in the Canadian provinces of Ontario and Manitoba, and the U.S. state of Minnesota. The name "MOM" is an acronym for Manitoba, Ontario, and Minnesota, the two provinces and one state traversed by this multi-highway route.  MOM's Way provides a secondary route between the cities of Winnipeg, Manitoba and Thunder Bay, Ontario.  Many segments of MOM's Way are connected to the Old Dawson Trail, the first all-Canadian route between Thunder Bay and Winnipeg.

The roads included along the route are:
Minnesota State Highway 313 between the Manitoba border and Warroad.
Minnesota State Highway 11 between Warroad and Baudette.
Minnesota State Highway 72 through Baudette to the Ontario border.
Ontario Highway 11 from the Minnesota border, through Rainy River and Fort Frances, to Thunder Bay.

See also
Old Dawson Trail

References

Roads in Thunder Bay District
Roads in Rainy River District
Roads in Manitoba
Roads in Minnesota
Transport in Steinbach, Manitoba